The Distinguished Conduct Star is the second highest military award of the Philippines, preceded in precedence only by the Medal of Valor.  The award was established in 1939, by President Manuel L. Quezon.  With its establishment the award replaced the Philippine Constabulary Distinguished Conduct Star.

Criteria
This decoration is awarded to a person who, while serving in any capacity with the Armed Forces of the Philippines, distinguishes themselves by an extraordinary act of heroism not justifying the award of a Medal of Valor; while engaged in military operations involving conflict with an armed enemy. The act or acts of heroism must have been so notable and have involved risk of life so extraordinary as to set the individual apart from his or her comrades.  The award is made by the Chief of Staff of the Armed Forces of the Philippines.

Appearance
The medal is a red enameled, downward pointing star.  Centered on the star is a disc of gold. The disc contains the relief of a gold heraldic sea lion, holding a dagger in the dexter hand. It sits on the muzzles of two cannons, which occupy the sinister and dexter flanks. Two bows are at the base of the disc and rest horizontally across arrows between the breeches of the two cannons. Spears are placed vertically point up and superimposed over the crossed arrows. The star is attached to a bar in gold with engraved with the phase For Gallantry. The bar is attached to the base of a wreath made up of Sampaguita white flower buds and green leaves. The award is worn suspended from the neck by a red ribbon with the blue stripe at the center.

See also
Awards and decorations of the Armed Forces of the Philippines

References

Citations

Bibliography
 The AFP Adjutant General, AFP Awards and Decorations Handbook, 1995, 1997, OTAG.

Distinguished Conduct Star